Dionysopolis may refer to:
 Dionysupolis, a city in ancient Thrace, now in Bulgaria (a Black Sea coastal town named Balchik )
 Dionysiopolis, a city in ancient Phrygia, now in Turkey
 Dionysopolis Indiae, a city in ancient India inter Gangem, now in Afghanistan